The Festival Printemps des Arts de Monte-Carlo is a music and dance festival in Monaco, which was created in response to the wishes of Princess Grace and which is today under the patronage of Princess Caroline of Hanover.

External links

Festivals in Monaco
Spring (season) events in Monaco
Music festivals in Europe